Belize competed in the 2019 Pan American Games in Lima, Peru from July 26 to August 11, 2019.

On July 19, 2019, the Belize team of six athletes (three per gender) was announced. Triathlete Jordan Santos was the country's flag bearer during the opening ceremony.

Competitors
The following is the list of number of competitors (per gender) participating at the games per sport/discipline.

Athletics (track and field)

Belize received one wild card to enter one woman in the 100 metres event.

Key
Note–Ranks given for track events are for the entire round

Track event
Women

Bodybuilding

Belize qualified one male bodybuilder.

Men

No results were provided for the prejudging round, with only the top six advancing.

Canoeing

Belize qualified two canoe sprint athletes (one male and one female). Belize was later reallocated an additional female quota.

Sprint

Qualification Legend: F = Qualify to final (medal); SF = Qualify to semifinal. Position is within the heat

Triathlon

Belize received a wild card to enter one male triathlete.

Men

References

Nations at the 2019 Pan American Games
2019
2019 in Belizean sport